The 1939–40 Hong Kong First Division League season was the 32nd since its establishment.

Overview
South China won the title.

References
RSSSF

Hong Kong First Division League seasons
Hong
First